The firm of Goddard & Gibbs were London-based English glassmakers and stained glass window manufacturers. The company was established by Walter Gibbs in 1868, although one firm which it subsequently acquired had been established earlier, in 1855. Goddard & Gibbs was formed by a merger in 1938; the company continued to trade until it was acquired by Hardman & Co. in 2006. Hardman itself ceased to trade in 2008.

History

James Clark & Sons
Established by a James Clark in 1855, the firm was still trading at Scoresby Street, Blackfriars in 1900. Soon after, it was acquired by Walter Gibbs & Son.

Walter Gibbs & Sons
The son of a glass stainer, John Gibbs, and his wife Elizabeth (née Booker), Walter Gibbs (1846–1889) established his firm in 1868. His wife Sarah Ann Colwell (1847–1895), and sons Walter Thomas (1870–1927), Arthur Augustus (1872–1938), and Horace Albert (1877–1917) also worked for and with him. In 1910 the firm was trading at 210 Union Street, Southwark.

Goddard's Glass Works
A trader by the name of Goddard established a shop in Woolwich in 1933.

Goddard & Gibbs

The firm known as Goddard & Gibbs was formed by the merger in 1938 of Walter Gibbs & Sons and Goddard's Glass Works. The merged firm kept its name despite subsequent takeovers by James Clark & Eaton Ltd and, in 1978, by Charles Clark. The firm and its predecessors all traded in Blackfriars, until it eventually operated from studios at 41-49 Kingsland Road in Dalston, London. Late in its history the firm moved to Marlborough House, Cooks Road, Stratford (subsequently demolished for Crossrail works at Pudding Mill Lane). In 2006 it was acquired by Hardman & Co., and ceased to have a separate identity. Hardman itself closed just two years later, and the Goddard & Gibbs archive appears to have been lost at that point.

A successor firm reviving the Goddard & Gibbs name was soon established, initially at Corsham, and subsequently at Trowbridge, Wiltshire, but which now focuses on lead window repairs.

The firm had an international reputation for contemporary stained glass as well as the restoration of older stained glass. Early in its history it advertised a unique ability to make embossed glass signs and showboards at 'the shortest notice'. After the Second World War the firm concentrated on replacement glass for bomb-damaged churches, as well as for churches in Canada, Ghana, New Zealand, Nigeria, Nyasaland, South Africa and the United States.

Goddard & Gibbs' designers included Arthur Edward Buss (1905–1999), John Lawson (1932–2009) (who joined in 1970 from Faith Craft), Maud Sumner (1902–1985), and George Cooper-Abbs (1901–1966). Other designers later in the history of the firm included Caroline Swash, Zoe Angle, Chris Madline, Laura Perry, Louise Watson, Sophie Lister-Hussain and Sharon McMullin.

Selected windows
Sanctuary windows of St John the Evangelist Church, Newbury, Berkshire, by AE Buss of Goddard & Gibbs, 1955.

Baptistry window of St James's, Sussex Gardens, London, depicting the Te Deum by AE Buss of Goddard & Gibbs as a Battle of Britain memorial, 1955.

East window of St Michael and All Angels, Lansdowne Drive, London Fields, depicting St Michael, by AE Buss of Goddard & Gibbs, 1959.
East window of St Mark's Church, Myddelton Square, London, depicting the Ascension, designed by AE Buss of Goddard & Gibbs, 1962.
Mural window at the Ramada hotel in Dubai depicting floral displays, designed by John Lawson of Goddard & Gibbs, 1983. The window was 41 metres high and was the tallest stained-glass window in the world. The Ramada was demolished in 2016, and the window was placed into storage.
East window of Holy Cross and All Saints, Warley Hill, Essex, by John Lawson of Goddard & Gibbs, 1986.
Glass dome of the Jame' Asr Hassanil Bolkiah Mosque, Kiarong, Bandar Seri Begawan, Brunei, by John Lawson of Goddard & Gibbs, 1994.

West window of Henry VII's Lady Chapel at Westminster Abbey depicting royal coats of arms, designed by John Lawson and made by Goddard & Gibbs, 1995.
Millennium window at St Peter's, Boughton Monchelsea, Kent, by John Lawson of Goddard & Gibbs, 2000.
Windows in the Lady Chapel of All Saints Church, Benhilton, Sutton, London, depicting Our Lady with the infant Jesus, designed by John Lawson of Goddard & Gibbs, 2001.

Gallery

See also
 British and Irish stained glass (1811–1918)
 Victorian era
 Dalle de verre

References

British stained glass artists and manufacturers
Defunct glassmaking companies
Glassmaking companies of England
1868 establishments in England
2006 mergers and acquisitions
2008 disestablishments in England